Ilyich Street or Ilyicha Street is a street in Akademgorodok of Novosibirsk, Russia. It starts from a T-shaped intersection with Morskoy Prospekt, runs north-west and then forms a crossroad with Universitetsky Prospekt, Pirogov Street and Vekua Footpath.

The streets adjacent to the street: Tsvetnoy Proyezd and Vesenny Proyezd.

Architecture
 Akademia House of Culture is a building built in 1962.
 Shopping Complex of Akademgorodok is a public and shopping complex built in 1964. In 1967, the architectural project was awarded at the international exhibition in Monreal.
 Zolotaya Dolina is an eight-story hotel. It was built in 1966.

Nature
A small stretch of forest is located along the odd side of the street. This forest is inhabited by ants (more than 300 anthills).

Gallery

References

External links
 Улица с историей: три здания в Академгородке решили признать памятниками культуры. НГС.НОВОСТИ.

Streets in Novosibirsk
Sovetsky District, Novosibirsk